Mrgashen (until 1964, "the village attached to Sovkhoz No. 36") is a village in the Kotayk Province of Armenia. It is located along the left bank of the Arzni-Shamiram aqueduct. Mrgashen was officially founded in March 1960 around the state-owned collective farm or sovkhoz No. 6. The local economy is highly dependent on agriculture, based primarily on orchard cultivation and pig or cattle-breeding. The community currently has a school, kindergarten, house of culture (seating for 300), medical station (with 6 employees), and a library. 60% of households receive natural gas and drinking water for the village comes from the Arzakan-Yerevan network, while water for irrigation comes from the Arzni-Shamiram aqueduct.

See also 
Kotayk Province

References 

 
 World Gazeteer: Armenia – World-Gazetteer.com
 

Populated places in Kotayk Province